My Music, is a Polish record label founded in 2006 in Poznań by Remigiusz "DJ Remo" Łupicki and Dominik Urbański, previously owners of UMC Records.

Labels best selling artists include such artists as Gosia Andrzejewicz, Eldo, Dawid Kwiatkowski and Agnieszka Włodarczyk among others, with several albums certified Gold in Poland.

Artists

Current

CF98
Dawid Kwiatkowski
dziecięce przeboje
Eldo
Irena Santor
Gosia Andrzejewicz
Hans Solo
HST
Ira
Jula
Mariusz Wawrzyńczyk
Mezo
Michał Wiśniewski
Mrokas
Patrycja Grabarczyk
Pięć Dwa Dębiec
Red Lips
RH+
Saszan
SBS
Verba

Former

Abradab
Agnieszka Włodarczyk
Bauagan 
B.O.K
Chiwas & Nowator
DJ Remo
DKA
DNA & GAL
Doniu
Doniu & Liber
Duże Pe
Dziun 
Fenomen
Furia Futrzaków
Grupa Operacyjna
High End Projekt 
Indios Bravos 
Jay Delano 
Jeden Osiem L 
Kalwi & Remi 
Kasia Wilk
KrzyHu 
Kris 
Kto To 
Liber
Los Pierdols 
Mezo, Tabb & Kasia Wilk  
Michał Łanuszka 
Owal/Emcedwa 
Piotr Banach
Pneuma (disbanded) 
Proletaryat
PTP 
Red & Spinache 
Robert M. 
Rotary 
Sumptuastic 
Sylwia Grzeszczak & Liber
Tallib
Wolny Band 
Wojciech Więckowski

References

External links
 Official website

Polish independent record labels